is a Japanese manga artist from Asakura, Fukuoka Prefecture best known for his fantasy comedy manga series Heaven's Lost Property, which has been adapted into an anime television series and two feature films.

Works

References

External links
 

Living people
Manga artists from Fukuoka Prefecture
Year of birth missing (living people)
Place of birth missing (living people)